CSIS may refer to:

 Canadian Security Intelligence Service, Canada's primary national intelligence service
 Center for Strategic and International Studies, a think tank in the US
 Centre for Strategic and International Studies, a think tank in Jakarta, Indonesia
 Civil Service Islamic Society, a British non-political, voluntary society
 Container Shipping Information Service, a trade group for the container shipping industry

See also

 
 CSI (disambiguation)